Magdolna Kulcsár (born 18 February 1948) is a Hungarian middle-distance runner. She competed in the women's 800 metres at the 1972 Summer Olympics.

References

1948 births
Living people
Athletes (track and field) at the 1972 Summer Olympics
Hungarian female middle-distance runners
Olympic athletes of Hungary
Place of birth missing (living people)